Liu Qingsong (born November 1963) is an admiral (shangjiang) of the People's Liberation Army (PLA), serving as political commissar of the Northern Theater Command. He previously served as political commissar of the Eastern Theater Command Navy and deputy political commissar of the Eastern Theater Command.

Biography 
Liu was born in Zhangqiu County (now Zhangqiu District of Jinan), Shandong, in November 1963. He served as the deputy director of the Guangzhou Military Region Air Force Command's (today's Southern Theater Command Air Force) Political Department before being appointed director of the Political Department of the Northern Theater Command Air Force. One year later, he was commissioned as deputy director of the Political Department of the People's Liberation Army Air Force. In July 2018, he rose to become political commissar of the Eastern Theater Command Navy and deputy political commissar of the Eastern Theater Command. In January 2022, he was appointed political commissar of the Northern Theater Command.

He was promoted to the rank of major general (shaojiang) in July 2014, vice admiral (zhongjiang) in June 2019, and admiral (shangjiang) in January 2022.

On 28 January 2022, as political commissar of the Northern Theater Command, Liu Qingsong joined CCP Secretary of Liaoning Zhang Guoqing, Governor of Liaoning Li Lecheng, and Chairman of the Liaoning Political Consultative Conference Zhou Bo in a ceremony to welcome the Chinese New Year and thank the civilian government of Liaoning for its support to the PLA. In the discussion, Liu noted that 2021 was a milestone year in the Party's history, that "we should unite more closely around the CPC Central Committee with Comrade Xi Jinping at the core," and praised the revitalization and modernization of Liaoning Province.

According to images of Liu's ribbon rack in 2022, Liu joined the military in 1989 (at 26 years of age) and has served 33 years in the PLA.

References 

1963 births
Living people
People from Jinan
People's Liberation Army generals from Shandong